Tim Ellis is an Australian performer, author and lecturer in the world of magic and illusion.

Biography
Ellis was born in Melbourne. He began performing magic at the age of nine after his grandfather gave him a magic set as a gift. At the age of 14 he was the youngest magician ever admitted to The Magic Circle of Victoria and two years later won four out of their five annual awards. In 1980, he won the title 'Best Under 18 Magician of Australia'.

In 1986, he created and produced 'National Magic Week', a ten-day festival of the magical arts which was presented annually for the next nine years.

Ellis produced and edited 'Australian Magic Monthly', a national publication for magicians which came out monthly for 100 issues, while writing a regular column on the Australian magic scene for the international Genii.

Ellis was married to Kristina Todorovich from 1990 to 1998.

Ellis created 'MagicSports' a form of improvised magic games based on Keith Johnstone's 'Theatre Sports'.

In 1992 he bought Australia's oldest magic shop, 'Bernard's Magic Shop' which he owned for several years.

In 1994 he was awarded second place in 'Micro Magic' at the FISM World Magic Championship in Yokohama, Japan. This followed the 'Special Prize of the Jury' he was awarded at the 1991 FISM in Lausanne, Switzerland for his 'Six Card Rap'.

Ellis was married to Sue-Anne Webster from 1998 to 2011. Ellis performed as a guest artist at the FISM World Championship of Magic, performing in the Close Up Gala in 2000 and the Stage Gala in 2003. In 2001, Ellis and Webster were voted 'Most Valuable Performers' by their peers at the close up magic convention 'Fechter's Finger Flicking Frolic' in Batavia, New York.

Ellis sat on the jury at the FISM World Championship of Magic in 2003 at Den Haag, in 2006 at Stockholm, and 2009 in Beijing. In 2004 Ellis and Webster produced three magic teaching DVDs, and together with a team of Melbourne magicians they set a new Guinness World Record for the world's longest magic show by performing non-stop for 75 hours at Luna Park, Melbourne, Australia. The previous record was 24 hours. In the same year Ellis produced the 29th Australian Convention of Magicians.

In 2007 Ellis was diagnosed with Asperger's Syndrome.

After the 2007 show Poker in the Face, Ellis presented two shows for the 2008 Melbourne International Comedy Festival Illusionarium with Ellis & Webster and Something About Needles & Razorblades. Later that year he performed The Wizards of Aus at The Melbourne Magic Festival. The 2009 Festival saw his new shows AspyCadabra, and Ellis in Wonderland performed with Sue-Anne Webster. The 2010 Festival saw two new shows Escape From Reality and Illusionarium 2010 and in 2011 they premiered Once Upon A Time... 2012 his solo shows The Mad Hatter's Magical Tea Party and Timeless Magic followed by three new shows in 2013 The Mad Hatter's History of Hattery, As Seen on TV and In Dreams. In 2014 he presented the improvised show Magic vs Music: The Audience Always Wins and 1 Defining Moment as well as Immaculate Deceptions for the Bally On High Festival. At the 2015 Melbourne Magic Festival he presented The Mad Hatter: Return to Wonderland and the poker themed show Full House, as well as producing MagicSports which won the Melbourne International Comedy Festival Award for 'Funniest Show'. At the 2016 Festival he presented This Is Magic and an updated version of In Dreams. For 2017 This Is Magic returned and his popular character from Young Talent Time was resurrected in the show Professor Googalfitz Explains it All. In 2018 the Festival moved to the Melba Spiegeltent and Tim teamed with Carisa Hendrix to present the show World of Wizards and also performed The Late Night Magic, Comedy & Something Ellis Hour and Spellbinder at The Laneway Theatre. In 2019 he presented The Mad Hatter's Magical Tea Party and As Seen on TV. Due to the Coronavirus Pandemic, the 2020 Melbourne Magic Festival was cancelled and Tim spent most of the year performing 50 shows via Zoom.

Tim is the artistic director and founder of the Melbourne Magic Festival and  president of The Australian Institute of Magic.

He has performed on television programs including Midday, Good Morning Australia, The Daryl Somers Show, Young Talent Time, Hey Hey It's Saturday, Sunrise, and The Today Show. He also appears in Nadia Tass's feature film Matching Jack (2010).

Works

Stage shows

Published works

Awards and honours

 Excellence in Magic Award - Melbourne Magic Festival (2017)
 Guinness World Record (with team of Melbourne magicians) – World's Longest Magic Show, 85 hours (2016)
 Melbourne International Comedy Festival Award (for MagicSports) – Melbourne Magic Festival (2015)
 Nominated Lecturers of the Year (with Sue-Anne Webster) – The Magic Castle, Hollywood (2005)
 Guinness World Record (with team of Melbourne magicians) – World's Longest Magic Show, 75 hours (2004)
 Most Valuable Participants (with Sue-Anne Webster) – Fechter's Finger Flicking Frolic, New York (2001)
 Second place, Close Up Magic – FISM World Magic Championships – Yokohama, Japan (1994)
 Special Prize of the Jury – FISM World Magic Championships – Lausanne, Switzerland (1991)
 Best Stage Magic in Australia – National Australian Magic Convention (1990)
 Best Trick – National Australian Magic Convention (1986 & 1990)
 Best Close Up Magician in Australia – National Australian Magic Convention (1986)
 Best Close Up Magician – Ballarat, Newcastle, and Adelaide Magic Conventions (1989)
 Best Card Magician – Adelaide Magic Conventions (1989)
 Teenage Champion Magician of Australia – National Australian Magic Convention (1980)
 Harmony Trophy – Magic Circle of Victoria (1978, 1979)
 Ron Kreyt's Shield for Close Up Magic – Magic Circle of Victoria (1979)
 Improver's Trophy – Magic Circle of Victoria (1979)
 Librarian's Trophy – Magic Circle of Victoria (1979)

References

External links
 

Australian magicians
Escapologists
Living people
People from Melbourne
People with Asperger syndrome
Year of birth missing (living people)